Baron Kristian Axel von Alfthan (1 March 1864 – 13 March 1919) was a Finnish physician and politician, born in Oulu. He was a member of the Diet of Finland from 1894 to 1906 and of the Parliament of Finland from 1907 to 1909, representing the Swedish People's Party of Finland (SFP). He took part in the Finnish Civil War on the White side as a military physician.

References

1864 births
1919 deaths
People from Oulu
People from Oulu Province (Grand Duchy of Finland)
Swedish People's Party of Finland politicians
Members of the Diet of Finland
Members of the Parliament of Finland (1907–08)
Members of the Parliament of Finland (1908–09)
Finnish military doctors
People of the Finnish Civil War (White side)
University of Helsinki alumni